Thayiya Madilu is a 2007 Indian Kannada-language drama film directed and written by S. Narayan. The film stars Shiva Rajkumar, Rakshita and Jayasudha. The film was produced by Narayan's home production while the original score and soundtrack were composed by S. A. Rajkumar.

The film was the first release of the year 2007 and it was an average grosser at the box-office. Critics lauded the performances of the lead actors and termed it a spectacular treat. The lead actress Rakshita announced her retirement from acting after this film.

Cast
 Shiva Rajkumar as Nanda Kumar
 Rakshita 
 Jayasudha
 Avinash
 Doddanna
 Vinaya Prasad
 Mukhyamantri Chandru
 Sihi Kahi Chandru
 Shobharaj
 Girija Lokesh
 Mandeep Roy

Soundtrack
The music of the film was composed by S. A. Rajkumar and lyrics written by S. Narayan.

References

External source

 Thayiya Madilu at GGpedia
 Indiaglitz review

2007 films
2000s Kannada-language films
Indian drama films
Films directed by S. Narayan
Films scored by S. A. Rajkumar
2007 drama films